John "Jack" Van den Eynde (14 April 1914 – 18 September 1993) was a Belgian footballer and Davis Cup tennis player. He played his football as a striker and featured in 40 matches in the Belgian First Division at Beerschot VAC, scoring 12 goals. His brother Stanley Van den Eynde was also a footballer, also playing for Beerschot. Their family was closely involved with the club. Their family house was located on Della Faillelaan in Antwerp.

Honours
Beerschot
 Belgian First Division runner-up: 1936–37

See also
List of Belgium Davis Cup team representatives

References

External links
 
 
 

1914 births
1993 deaths
Belgian footballers
Belgian people of English descent
K. Beerschot V.A.C. players
Association football forwards
Belgian male tennis players
Sportspeople from Antwerp Province